Koshksaray Rural District is in Koshksaray District of Marand County, East Azerbaijan province, Iran. At the National Census of 2006, its population was 22,941 in 5,600 households. There were 23,173 inhabitants in 6,585 households at the following census of 2011. At the most recent census of 2016, the population of the rural district was 23,822 in 7,128 households. The largest of its 22 villages was Dizaj Hoseyn Beyg, with 4,060 people, which subsequently became a city in 2019. In that year, the rural district and the city of Koshksaray were separated from the Central District to establish Koshksaray District, with two rural districts and two cities. The village of Zanjireh is the center of the rural district.

References 

Marand County

Rural Districts of East Azerbaijan Province

Populated places in East Azerbaijan Province

Populated places in Marand County